Zopherus is a genus of beetles comprising 19 species. They live in the Americas and are adapted to wood-boring.

Distribution

Species of Zopherus only live in the Americas, where they are distributed from Venezuela to the southern United States. Ten species live in the United States, five of them in California.

Description
Members of the genus are long and cylindrical, with very thick exoskeletons. Indeed, the elytra are so thick that it is often necessary to drill a hole in them in order to mount specimens. Species living north of the Rio Grande are almost all uniformly black in colour, while the tropical species are almost all strongly patterned in contrasting black and white. The animal's head is largely hidden by the thorax. The elytra are fused together, rendering Zopherus species unable to fly.

Ecology
Zopherus species are adapted for boring into wood, some species even being reported to bore into sound wood, rather than only dead wood. Z. tristis lives under the bark of the desert tamarisk in the Colorado Desert, while Z. granicollis bores into the root crowns of Jeffrey pine (Pinus jeffreyi) and single-leaf pine (Pinus monophylla).

Taxonomy
The genus Zopherus encompasses species previously referred to three other genera, Megazopherus, Zopherinus and Zopherodes, all of which are now synonymized under Zopherus. Many of the species have also been known by a number of taxonomic synonyms. The genus was initially erected in 1832 by George Robert Gray, using the spelling Zopheros. This was later emended by Laporte de Castelnau to the more usual transliteration Zopherus; the authorship should nonetheless ascribed to Gray, and not to Laporte, as many authors have done.

Use as living jewels 

The species Zopherus chilensis from Yucatán, Mexico has been used in jewelry as living jewels.

Etymology

Species
Charles A. Triplehorn recognised 19 species in his 1972 monograph:

Zopherus angulicollis Champion, 1884
Zopherus championi Triplehorn, 1972
Zopherus chilensis Gray, 1832
Zopherus concolor LeConte, 1851
Zopherus elegans Horn, 1870
Zopherus gracilis Horn, 1867
Zopherus granicollis Horn, 1885
Zopherus jansoni Champion, 1884
Zopherus jourdani Sallé, 1849
Zopherus laevicollis Colier, 1841
Zopherus mexicanus Gray, 1832
Zopherus nervosus Solier, 1841
Zopherus nodulosus Solier, 1841
Zopherus opacus Horn, 1867
Zopherus sanctaehelenae (Blaisdell, 1931)
Zopherus solieri Triplehorn, 1972
Zopherus tristis LeConte, 1851
Zopherus uteanus (Casey, 1907)
Zopherus xestus Triplehorn, 1972

References

Zopheridae
Woodboring beetles
Beetles of North America
Taxa named by George Robert Gray